Mateusz Kaczmarek (born 26 February 2003) is a Polish professional footballer who plays as a midfielder for Wisła Puławy, on loan from Miedź Legnica.

Career statistics

Club

Notes

References 

2003 births
Living people
Polish footballers
Poland youth international footballers
Association football midfielders
Raków Częstochowa players
Miedź Legnica players
Wisła Puławy players
Ekstraklasa players
I liga players
II liga players
III liga players
Sportspeople from Częstochowa